Lake Burton may refer to:

Lake Burton (Georgia), a lake in Rabun County, Georgia
Lake Burton (Quebec), a lake near Long Island, Quebec
Lake Burton (Antarctica)